Diogo da Costa Silva (born 11 January 1995) is a Brazilian professional footballer who plays for Botafogo-SP as a defender.

Professional career
Silva is a youth producto of Brazil, and began his career in the academies of Diadema, Corinthians, and Flamengo before playing professionally in the second and third division of Brazil. Silva made his professional debut with Londrina in a 3-0 Campeonato Brasileiro Série B win over Paraná on 31 July 2019. On 21 September 2020, Silva signed a contract with in the Portuguese Primeira Liga.

In December 2022, Silva returned to Brazil and joined Botafogo-SP.

External links

Fora de Jogo Profile

References

1995 births
Living people
Footballers from São Paulo
Brazilian footballers
Association football defenders
Maringá Futebol Clube players
Londrina Esporte Clube players
Ypiranga Futebol Clube players
Gil Vicente F.C. players
Botafogo Futebol Clube (SP) players
Campeonato Brasileiro Série B players
Campeonato Brasileiro Série C players
Primeira Liga players
Brazilian expatriate footballers
Brazilian expatriate sportspeople in Portugal
Expatriate footballers in Portugal